

Electric Tower (or General Electric Tower) is a historic office building and skyscraper located at the corner of Washington and Genesee Streets in Buffalo. It is the seventh tallest building in Buffalo. It stands  and 14 stories tall and is in the Beaux-Arts Classical Revival style. It was designed by James A. Johnson and built in 1912. The tower was based upon an earlier Electric Tower constructed for the 1901 Pan-American Exposition; as with most of the buildings constructed for that event, the original was only temporary and demolished shortly after the fair ended. Additions were made in 1923 and 1928. The white terra-cotta clad was originally built as the Niagara Mohawk Building and features an octagonal tower which steps back three times to terminate in a large lantern. It is also known as Iskalo Electric Tower, for the real estate development company that owns the building.

The decorative symbols featuring aspects of electricity production are considered precursors to subsequent art deco design.

Like One M & T Plaza, the spire of the tower is illuminated with different holiday colors at night throughout the year. Both buildings are illuminated blue and gold for the Buffalo Sabres during the National Hockey League playoffs.

The Electric Tower hosts the annual Buffalo Ball Drop on New Year's Eve, one of the continent's largest ball drops outside the New York City ball drop. Crowds gather in Roosevelt Plaza to celebrate the New Year. The Buffalo Ball Drop is accompanied by live performances and a firework show.

It was listed on the National Register of Historic Places in September 2008.

Gallery

See also
 List of tallest buildings in Buffalo
 Niagara Hudson Building, in Syracuse, also known as "Niagara Mohawk Building"

References

External links

 General Electric Tower - Buffalo, NY - U.S. National Register of Historic Places on Waymarking.com
 
 Electric Tower, Buffalo history website
Preservation Studios Buffalo, NY: historic building rehabilitation and preservation consultants

Art Deco architecture in New York (state)
Beaux-Arts architecture in New York (state)
Office buildings completed in 1912
Office buildings on the National Register of Historic Places in New York (state)
Skyscraper office buildings in Buffalo, New York
Tourist attractions in Buffalo, New York
Buildings and structures in Buffalo, New York
1912 establishments in New York (state)
National Register of Historic Places in Buffalo, New York
Green & Wicks buildings